Ambohimahamasina is a rural commune in the Ambalavao District in Haute Matsiatra Region in central Madagascar.

It is situated near Andringitra National Park.

Climate
Ambohimahamasina has an oceanic climate (Köppen: Cfb).

References

Populated places in Haute Matsiatra